The Brussels Indoor (also known as the Donnay Indoor Championships) is a defunct professional tennis tournament played on indoor carpet courts at Forest National in Brussels. It was part of the Grand Prix tennis circuit initially and later, for three years, the ATP Championship Series of the ATP Tour. The tournament was established in 1980, becoming the second tournament to be played in Brussels, along with the ATP Brussels Outdoor. The following year the outdoor tournament was played for the last time, leaving the Donnay Indoor Championships as the sole professional tournament in the region.

It was held between 1981 and 1988 and then again from 1990 until 1992.

Past finals

Singles

Doubles

See also
List of tennis tournaments

References

External links
ATP World Tour website

 
Grand Prix tennis circuit
ATP Tour
Indoor tennis tournaments
Tennis tournaments in Belgium
Sport in Brussels
Defunct tennis tournaments in Europe
Defunct sports competitions in Belgium
Carpet court tennis tournaments